John V. Lindsay Wildcat Academy Charter School is an alternative school for disenfranchised students who have dropped out of the regular public school system.  Originally called Wildcat Academy, the school was founded in 1992 by Amalia Betanzos and Ronald Tabano as an alternative public school.  It was converted to a charter school in 2000.

The school currently operates two campuses.  The original location is at 17 Battery Place, in lower Manhattan.  The second is in the Banknote Building, 1239 Lafayette Avenue in the Hunt's Point section of The Bronx.

A third campus in the Banknote Building, the Second Opportunity School, which was established in 1997 in cooperation with NYC Department of Education Chancellor Rudy Crew, catered to students on one-year suspension from NYC high schools. In 1999, the Second Opportunity School had 16 staff and 100 students.  Although the school had success working with troubled students, the City spent $60,000 per student, making it one of the most expensive public schools in New York City.  After 2006, the Second Opportunity School was run solely by the NYC Department of Education.

For the 2014–2015 academic year, JVL Wildcat Academy Charter School had 468 students, of which 98% were minorities and 89% were economically disadvantaged.  There were 23 full-time teachers, for a student-teacher ratio of 20:1.  US News and Word Report ranked the school's students as having 82% mathematics proficiency and 84% English proficiency, significantly higher than the district ratings (for 522 schools) of 53% in mathematics and 71% in English.

As of 2018, there are 500 students between the two locations.

The Bronx campus serves freshmen and sophomores.  The school occupies three floors in the Banknote building, with a lease running to 2022. The space was renovated using a $1 million grant from the Charles Hayden Foundation.  The Bronx campus houses the school's Culinary Internship program, which teaches cooking and other skills necessary to work in a restaurant, as well as the student-run JVL Wildcat Café and hydroponics garden.

Juniors and seniors attend the Manhattan campus.

References

Charter schools in New York City
Public high schools in the Bronx
High schools in New York City
Public high schools in Manhattan
1993 establishments in New York City
Educational institutions established in 1993
Hunts Point, Bronx
Lower Manhattan